Belgaon is a town in Bolangir district, Odisha, India.

Geography

Location
National Highway 201 passes through Belgan.

References

External links
 Satellite map of Belgan

Cities and towns in Bolangir district